Sergii Oleksandrovych Biloushchenko (born 16 September 1981 in Chaplinka) is a Ukrainian rower.  Serhiy Biloushchenko along with Serhiy Hryn, Oleh Lykov, and Leonid Shaposhnikov won the Bronze medal in quadruple sculls for Ukraine in 2004, falling behind Russia (Gold) and the Czech Republic (Silver).

References 
 
 
 
 Olympic results: Quadruple Sculls without Coxsw Men at Olympics.org

1981 births
Living people
Ukrainian male rowers
Olympic rowers of Ukraine
Rowers at the 2004 Summer Olympics
Rowers at the 2008 Summer Olympics
Olympic bronze medalists for Ukraine
Olympic medalists in rowing
Medalists at the 2004 Summer Olympics
World Rowing Championships medalists for Ukraine